Peter Fleming and John McEnroe successfully defended their title, defeating Pat Cash and Paul McNamee in the final, 6–2, 5–7, 6–2, 3–6, 6–3 to win the gentlemen's doubles title at the 1984 Wimbledon Championships. This was their fourth title. It earned McEnroe his third and last win of both the doubles and singles title in the same year

Seeds

  Peter Fleming /  John McEnroe (champions)
  Mark Edmondson /  Sherwood Stewart (quarterfinals)
  Tim Gullikson /  Tom Gullikson (quarterfinals)
  Kevin Curren /  Steve Denton (quarterfinals)
  Pat Cash /  Paul McNamee (final)
  Pavel Složil /  Tomáš Šmíd (third round)
  Sandy Mayer /  Ferdi Taygan (semifinals)
  Carlos Kirmayr /  Cássio Motta (first round)
  Stefan Edberg /  Anders Järryd (third round)
  Heinz Günthardt /  Balázs Taróczy (third round)
  Bernard Mitton /  Butch Walts (first round)
  John Alexander /  John Fitzgerald (quarterfinals)
  Tony Giammalva /  Steve Meister (first round)
  Broderick Dyke /  Wally Masur (third round)
  Colin Dowdeswell /  Van Winitsky (first round)
  Ken Flach /  Robert Seguso (third round)

Draw

Finals

Top half

Section 1

Section 2

Bottom half

Section 3

Section 4

References

External links

1984 Wimbledon Championships – Men's draws and results at the International Tennis Federation

Men's Doubles
Wimbledon Championship by year – Men's doubles